Seidel Creek is a stream in Berks County, Pennsylvania, in the United States.

Seidel Creek was named Jonathan Seidel, the operator of a local forge.

See also
List of rivers of Pennsylvania

References

Rivers of Berks County, Pennsylvania
Rivers of Pennsylvania